Wajima may refer to:

 Wajima, Ishikawa, city located in Ishikawa Prefecture, Japan.
 Wajima-nuri, a type of Japanese lacquerware from the same area.
 Wajima Station, a train station in Wajima, Ishikawa.
 Wajima Hiroshi, Japanese sumo wrestler.
 Wajima (horse), American Champion racehorse.
 Koichi Wajima, Japanese professional boxer.
 Tomoe Wajima, a fictional character in the anime/manga Hanasaku Iroha.